"Hand a Handkerchief to Helen" is a song and single written by Fred Tobias and Paul Evans and performed by British singer Susan Maughan.  
It featured Wally Stott and his orchestra and chorus. It was released in  1963 and reached 41 on the UK Charts, staying in the chart for three weeks.

References 

1963 songs
Songs written by Fred Tobias
Songs written by Paul Evans (musician)